Kniga Myortvykh is the third studio album by Russian alternative metal band Amatory. This is the last record with solo guitarist Sergey Osechkin who died on March 15, 2007.

Background 
The festival "Invasion" was the last strong impression of the summer. After that, [AMATORY] had less than a month to prepare for a new tour, which will cover not only Moscow with St. Petersburg, but also, for the first time in the group's career, the cities of the CIS. The tight concert schedule did not allow to finish recording the demo versions of the first numbers of the new album. Despite their busy touring schedule, [AMATORY] tried to fill every gap between tours and individual performances with new songs.

The title of the album was chosen using the game "Heads and Tails". [STEWART] wanted to name the album "The Story of my True", but [GANG] wanted to name the album "Book of the Dead". [STEWART] didn't like that title because of the hint of a diagnosis (Sergey had a suspicion of liver cancer). But eventually, the album was titled "Book of the Dead". It was released on October 13, 2006.

Track listing

Personnel 
Amatory
 Daniil "Stewart" Svetlov — drums
 Denis "Denver" Zhivotovsky — bass guitar, clean vocals
 Alexander "Alex" Pavlov — rhythm guitar
 Sergey "Gang" Osechkin — solo guitar
 Igor "Igor" Kapranov — death growl

References 

2006 albums
Amatory albums